The statampere (statA) is the derived electromagnetic unit of electric current in the CGS-ESU (electrostatic cgs) and Gaussian systems of units.:278
One statampere corresponds to / ampere ≈  in the SI system of units. 

The name statampere is a shortening of abstatampere, where the idea was that the prefix abstat  should stand for absolute electrostatic and mean ‘belonging to the CGS-ESU (electrostatic cgs) absolute system of units’.

The esu-cgs (or "electrostatic cgs") units are one of several systems of electromagnetic units within the centimetre–gram–second system of units; others include CGS-EMU (or "electrostatic cgs units"), Gaussian units, and Heaviside–Lorentz units. In the cgs-emu system, the unit of electric current is the abampere. The unit of current in the Heaviside–Lorentz system doesn't have a special name.

The other units in the cgs-esu and Gaussian systems related to the statampere are: 

 statcoulomb – the charge that passes in one second through any cross-section of a conductor carrying a steady current of one statampere
 statvolt – the electrostatic potential difference such that moving a charge of one statcoulomb through it at constant speed requires one erg of work to be done.
 statohm – the resistance of a conductor that, with a constant current of one statampere through it, maintains between its terminals a potential difference of one statvolt

Notes

References

Units of electric current
Centimetre–gram–second system of units